Chaudhry Sajjad Haider Gujjar is a Pakistani politician who was a Member of the Provincial Assembly of the Punjab, from 2002 to 2007 and again from May 2013 to May 2018.

Early life and education
He was born on 28 June 1957 in Sheikhupura.

He has a degree of Bachelor of Science (Hons) which he obtained in 1984 from University of Agriculture Faisalabad.

Political career
He was elected to the Provincial Assembly of the Punjab as a candidate of Pakistan Muslim League (N) (PML-N) from Constituency PP-169 (Sheikhupura-Cum-Nanakana Sahib-II) in 2002 Pakistani general election. He received 26,770 votes and defeated a candidate of Pakistan Muslim League (Q).

He ran for the seat of the Provincial Assembly of the Punjab as a candidate of PML-N from Constituency PP-169 (Sheikhupura-Cum-Nanakana Sahib-II) in 2008 Pakistani general election, but was unsuccessful. He received 20,789 votes and lost the seat to a candidate of Pakistan Peoples Party.

He was re-elected to the Provincial Assembly of the Punjab as a candidate of PML-N from Constituency PP-169 (Sheikhupura-Cum-Nanakana Sahib-II) in 2013 Pakistani general election.

In December 2013, he was appointed as Parliamentary Secretary for Housing Urban Development & Public Health Engineering.

References

Living people
Punjab MPAs 2013–2018
Punjab MPAs 2002–2007
1957 births
Pakistan Muslim League (N) politicians